Reşadiye is a village in the Ortaköy District, Aksaray Province, Turkey. Its population is 97 (2021). The village is populated by Kurds.

References

Villages in Ortaköy District, Aksaray
Kurdish settlements in Aksaray Province